was a Japanese politician. He was born in Shimane Prefecture. He served in the House of Representatives of the Empire of Japan. He was governor of Nagano Prefecture (1898-1899) and Miyazaki Prefecture (1899-1902).

References

1848 births
1921 deaths
People from Shimane Prefecture
Members of the House of Representatives (Empire of Japan)
Governors of Nagano
Governors of Miyazaki Prefecture